Brunei competed at the 2018 Commonwealth Games in the Gold Coast, Australia from April 4 to April 15, 2018. It was Brunei's 8th appearance at the Commonwealth Games.

The Brunei team consisted of 8 athletes (5 men and 3 women) that competed in 1 sport: lawn bowls.

Competitors
The following is the list of number of competitors participating at the Games per sport/discipline.

Lawn bowls

Brunei is scheduled to compete in the lawn bowls competition with 8 athletes (5 men and 3 women).

Men

Women

See also
Brunei at the 2018 Asian Games
Brunei at the 2018 Summer Youth Olympics

References

Nations at the 2018 Commonwealth Games
Brunei at the Commonwealth Games
2018 in Bruneian sport